A Date with the Falcon ( The Gay Falcon Steps In and A Date With Murder) is the second in a series of 16 films about the suave detective nicknamed The Falcon. The 1942 sequel features many of the same characters as the first film, The Gay Falcon (1941).

Plot
Scientist Waldo Sampsom (Alec Craig) has discovered how to manufacture cheap synthetic diamonds that are nearly identical to the real thing, as he demonstrates to diamond industry representatives and New York Police Inspector Mike O'Hara (James Gleason). Sampsom only wishes to provide them for the American defence effort, but O'Hara insists on providing him with a police guard.

Ruthless criminals however, abduct Sampsom to gain his secret. O'Hara recruits the reluctant amateur sleuth Gay Lawrence (George Sanders), known as the "Falcon", to search for him. Meanwhile, Helen Reed (Wendy Barrie), the Falcon's fiancée, becomes increasingly frustrated as the crime solving interferes with her marriage plans. Lawrence meets exotic jewel thief Rita Mara (Mona Maris) and suspects she is involved in Sampsom's disappearance. Rita pulls a gun on Lawrence and forces him to accompany her. Meanwhile Helen finds Rita's purse and inside, the address of the hotel where she is staying.

Lawrence escapes but learns from his sidekick, Jonathon "Goldie" Locke (Allen Jenkins) that Helen has gone to Rita's hotel, looking for him. Learning that Sampsom is also registered there, Lawrence breaks into his room and finds the scientist dead. The police arrive shortly after and attempt to arrest Lawrence, who asks O'Hara for a 12-hour reprieve to find the real murderer.

When Lawrence asks Helen to meet him at a nightclub, he knows Helen and Goldie will be followed. At gunpoint, Rita abducts Lawrence once again and takes him to her accomplice in a warehouse where Max Carlson (Victor Kilian) is holding the real Waldo Sampsom captive. After obtaining the secret formula, Max decides to kill Sampsom and Lawrence. Rita knocks out Lawrence and then turns on her partner, killing him, but does not locate Sampsom's formula.

When the police arrive at the warehouse, they find Lawrence and arrest him for murder. O'Hara takes him to police headquarters, where Helen has been arrested as Lawrence's accomplice. Rita and the remainder of the gang are brought in and when Goldie produces the secret formula which he had taken from Max, Lawrence explains that it was Herman, Waldo's twin who was killed in the hotel and that Rita killed Max for the formula.

Lawrence and his fiancée finally are able to resume their romantic getaway, but once on board their aircraft, a beautiful young woman greets Lawrence, arousing Helen's jealousy once again.

Cast

 George Sanders as Gay Lawrence, The Falcon
 Wendy Barrie as Helen Reed
 Allen Jenkins as Jonathan "Goldie" Locke
 James Gleason as Detective Inspector O’Hara
 Mona Maris as Rita Mara
 Edward Gargan as Detective Bates (uncredited)
 Alec Craig as Waldo Samson / Herman Sampson (uncredited)
 Hans Conreid as Hotel clerk (uncredited)
 Victor Kilian as Max Carlson (uncredited)
 Frank Moran as "Dutch" (uncredited)
 Paul Newlan as Policeman at Federal Hotel (uncredited)
 Russ Clark as Needles (uncredited)
 Eddie Dunn as Grimes (uncredited)
 Frank Martinelli as "Louie (uncredited)
 Jack Carr as Taxi driver (uncredited)
 Eddie Borden as Taxi driver (uncredited)
 Roxanne Barkley as Jill (uncredited)
 Eddie Arden as Bellhop (uncredited)

Production
It was called The Gay Falcon Steps In. Filming started 1 August 1941.

In A Date with the Falcon, the Falcon is engaged to Helen Reed, but leading lady Wendy Barrie would never appear in future sequels. RKO had been trading on the British actress's notoriety as the girlfriend of gangster Bugsy Siegel, but did not have a continuing role for her in mind. A Date with the Falcon would be the first of many sequels that featured other actresses in leading roles. The series also became a breeding ground for other talented studio contractees including director Edward Dmytryk and actors Barbara Hale and Jane Greer. The Falcon series has been characterised as part of a new genre—film noir.

Reception
In his review of A Date with the Falcon, Bosley Crowther wrote in The New York Times that a pattern existed in the Falcon series:"...  the pattern. Mr. Sanders, an idle man of the world, is just about to be married—this time to Wendy Barrie—when a mystifying crisis arises—this time the disappearance of a scientist. Obviously Mr. Sanders doesn't care to enter the case; he never does—or never did, perhaps we should say. But duty and the lure of adventure inevitably drag him in. And so, for fifty or sixty minutes, he is off on a serio-comic chase, sleuthing a gang of murderous smugglers, while his girl and the police act bored and dense."

References

Notes

Citations

Bibliography

 Jewell, Richard and Vernon Harbin. The RKO Story. New Rochelle, New York: Arlington House, 1982. .

External links
 
 
 
 

1942 films
American black-and-white films
American detective films
American sequel films
Films directed by Irving Reis
RKO Pictures films
1940s crime thriller films
1940s mystery thriller films
American crime thriller films
American mystery thriller films
Films scored by Paul Sawtell
The Falcon (film character) films
1940s American films